The Saturn Award for Best Actor in a Streaming Television Series is one of the annual awards given by the American professional organization, the Academy of Science Fiction, Fantasy & Horror Films. The Saturn Awards are the oldest film-specialized awards to reward science fiction, fantasy, and horror achievements (the Hugo Award for Best Dramatic Presentation, awarded by the World Science Fiction Society who reward science fiction and fantasy in various media, is the oldest award for science fiction and fantasy films).

The award was introduced at the 45th Saturn Awards, honoring the best performances by actors in streaming presentations. It was not held at the 46th Saturn Awards but returned at the 47th Saturn Awards under its current name.

Nominees

See also
 Saturn Award for Best Actor on Television

References

External links
 Saturn Awards official website

Awards established in 2018
2018 establishments in the United States
Saturn Awards